Louise Todd Cope (1930–2020) was an American artist. Her work is included in the collections of the Smithsonian American Art Museum and the Philadelphia Museum of Art.

References

1930 births
2020 deaths
Artists from New Jersey
People from Ventnor City, New Jersey